Tebenna pretiosana is a moth of the family Choreutidae. It is known from Finland, Estonia, France, Spain, Italy (including Sardinia and Sicily), Greece, Bosnia and Herzegovina and Croatia.

References

External links
lepiforum.de

Tebenna
Moths of Europe
Moths described in 1842